My Blind Heart (German title Mein blindes Herz) is an Austrian feature film drama written, directed and edited by Peter Brunner. The film premiered at the International Film Festival Rotterdam and Slamdance Film Festival in Park City, Utah, in January/February 2014 and was nominated for a Golden Frog at the prestigious Camerimage Film Festival in November 2014.

Plot 
Kurt is a 29-year-old marine biologist who suffers from the rare disease Marfan syndrome, which makes him almost blind as well as giving him a very peculiar appearance. After his dream of working at a Shark School is shattered, Kurt kills his mother, with whom he has a suffocating relationship and sets out on a journey to rebel against his body and the limits society tries to set for him. A short stay at a care home results in chaos and him getting kicked out, and he ends up on the streets where he befriends 13-year-old runaway Conny. Conny becomes his partner in crime during his protesting actions, not knowing what Kurt's motives are. Finally, Kurt manages to use a former friend from the care home, Roberto, to help him achieve his ultimate goal.

Cast 
Christos Haas as Kurt
Jana McKinnon as Conny
Susanne Lothar as Mother
Georg Friedrich as Paul
Robert Schmiedt as Roberto
Christopher Schärf as David

Reception 
The film was mostly well received by critics. Varietys Dennis Harvey called it "a visually arresting black-and-white debut" while Clarence Tsui of The Hollywood Reporter said that it was "boasting scintillating visuals, revolutionary ideology which charges social norms head on, and powerful performances from its cast".

Accolades

References

External links 

Austrian drama films
2014 drama films